The Humans is a Romanian band from Bucharest. The group consists of vocalist Cristina Caramarcu, guitarist Alexandru Cismaru, keyboardist Alexandru Matei, bassist Alin Neagoe, and drummer Adi Tetrade. They represented Romania in the Eurovision Song Contest 2018 in Lisbon, Portugal, with the song "Goodbye".

The lead female singer from the band, Cristina Vasilache Caramarcu was chosen by Walt Disney Pictures to provide the singing voice of Miss Atlantis and to sing the song "Baby Mine" in the live-action movie Dumbo.

Discography

Singles

Band members

Cristina Caramarcu-Lead vocals
Alexandru Cismaru-Lead guitar, backing vocals
Alexandru Matei-Keyboard, backing vocals
Alin Neagoe-bass, backing vocals
Adrian Tanase-Guitar, vocals
Pedro Adi Tetrade-Drums, percussion

Supporting/additional members:
Corina Matei-Cello,violin,backing vocals

References

2017 establishments in Romania
Musical groups established in 2017
Eurovision Song Contest entrants of 2018
Eurovision Song Contest entrants for Romania
Romanian pop music groups
Romanian rock music groups
Musical groups from Bucharest